United Nations Security Council Resolution 1675, adopted unanimously on April 28, 2006, after recalling all previous resolutions on the situation in Western Sahara, including resolutions 1495 (2003), 1541 (2004) and 1634 (2005), the Council extended the mandate of the United Nations Mission for the Referendum in Western Sahara (MINURSO) until October 31, 2006.

Resolution

Observations
The Security Council reaffirmed the need for a durable and mutual solution to the Western Sahara problem, which would provide for the self-determination of the people of the territory. Both Morocco, the Polisario Front and regional states were urged to co-operate with the United Nations to end the political impasse and reach a solution to the long-running dispute.

Acts
All parties were called upon to respect military agreements reached with MINURSO regarding a ceasefire. Member States were called upon to consider contributing towards confidence-building measures to facilitate greater person-to-person contact, such as family visits. The mandate of MINURSO was extended and the Secretary-General Kofi Annan instructed to report on the situation in Western Sahara. Furthermore, he was also instructed to ensure greater compliance with the zero-tolerance sexual exploitation policy among MINURSO personnel.

See also
 Free Zone (region)
 Legal status of Western Sahara
 List of United Nations Security Council Resolutions 1601 to 1700 (2005–2006)
 Moroccan Wall
 Sahrawi Arab Democratic Republic

References

External links
 
Text of the Resolution at undocs.org

 1675
 1675
 1675
2006 in Western Sahara
2006 in Morocco
April 2006 events